Club Deportivo Municipal Cañar is a sports club based in Cañar, Ecuador. They are best known for their professional football team, which plays in the third level of Ecuadorian football, the Segunda Categoría.

Municipal Canar
Association football clubs established in 1987
1987 establishments in Ecuador